The USC Trojans football team competes as part of the National Collegiate Athletic Association (NCAA) Division I Football Bowl Subdivision (FBS), representing the University of Southern California in the Pac-12 Conference (Pac-12). Since the establishment of the team in 1888, USC has appeared in 55 bowl games, with a record of 35-20. The Trojans appeared in 34 Rose Bowls, winning 25, both records for the bowl.

Bowl games

References

USC Trojans

USC Trojans bowl games